Orange, New Jersey is governed within the Faulkner Act, formally known as the Optional Municipal Charter Law, under the Mayor-Council form of municipal government, with a directly elected mayor and a City Council consisting of four ward representatives and three at-large representatives. Councilmembers are elected to serve four-year terms of office in non-partisan elections on a staggered basis with the four ward seats and the three at-large seats coming up for election on an alternating cycle every two years.

Mayors
Dwayne D. Warren, 2012 to Present
Eldridge Hawkins Jr. 2008 to 2012
 Mims Hackett 1996 to 2008
Robert L. Brown 1988 to 1996, the city's first African-American mayor
Paul Monacelli (1984-88).
Joel L. Shain (1980-84)                                                                                                                                                                                                        
  *Russell A. Riley 
Joseph Promollo
William Howe Davis, 1942 to  1954.
Ovid C. Bianchi (July 1, 1938 - June 30, 1942).
Daniel Francis Minahan .
Arthur Browne Seymour, 1908 to 1912
George Huntington Hartford, 1878 to 1890.

References

Orange, New Jersey
 
Orange